Roberto Azar (born 21 March 1966) is a former professional tennis player from Argentina.

Career
Azar was runner-up of the San Marino Open in 1989. He also reached the semi-finals at the Bologna Outdoor tournament that season, beating world 27 Ronald Agenor in quarter-finals. He finished runner-up in the 

In 1990 he made quarter-finals in Casablanca and then put together the best performance of his career up to that date by reaching the round of 16 in the ATP German Open, one of the tours most prestigious events. He defeated 11th seed and world number 18 Carl-Uwe Steeb in the second round. Another solid effort in Umag saw him make the quarter-finals and he entered the 1990 French Open as a qualifier, but had entered the top 100 for the first time. In what was his first ever Grand Slam, Azar defeated American Lawson Duncan and Czech Martin Střelba, before losing to Jonas Svensson in the third round. He also made the semi-finals of the Sanremo Open, later that year.
 
He was a quarter-finalist at Genoa and a semi-finalist at San Marino in 1991. The following year he won his only other Grand Slam match, French Open against Henrik Holm. In 1993 made the quarter-finals at Atlanta.

Grand Prix career finals

Singles: 1 (0–1)

Doubles: 1 (0–1)

Challenger titles

Singles: (1)

References

1966 births
Living people
Argentine male tennis players
Tennis players from Buenos Aires
South American Games gold medalists for Argentina
South American Games silver medalists for Argentina
South American Games medalists in tennis
Competitors at the 1982 Southern Cross Games
People from Lincoln Partido